Frederick Charles Loofbourow (February 8, 1874 – July 8, 1949) was a U.S. Representative from Utah.

Born in Atlantic, Iowa, Loofbourow was educated in the common schools of Iowa.
He moved with his parents to Utah in 1889.
He graduated from the Ogden Military Academy, Ogden, Utah, in 1892, and from the law department of the University of California at Berkeley in 1896.
He was admitted to the bar the same year and commenced practice in Salt Lake City, Utah.
He served as district attorney of the third judicial district of Utah 1905-1911, and district judge 1911-1916.
He resumed the practice of law.

Loofbourow was elected as a Republican to the Seventy-first Congress to fill the vacancy caused by the death of Elmer O. Leatherwood and on the same day was elected to the Seventy-second Congress and served from November 4, 1930, to March 3, 1933.
He was an unsuccessful candidate for reelection in 1932 to the Seventy-third Congress and for election in 1934 to the Seventy-fourth Congress.
He resumed the practice of law in Salt Lake City, until his retirement.
He died in Salt Lake City, July 8, 1949.
His remains were cremated and the ashes scattered.

Sources

1874 births
1949 deaths
UC Berkeley School of Law alumni
District attorneys in Utah
Utah state court judges
Republican Party members of the United States House of Representatives from Utah
People from Atlantic, Iowa
Lawyers from Salt Lake City